Nada Será Como Antes (English: Nothing Remains the Same) is a 2016 Brazilian television series created by Guel Arraes and Jorge Furtado. It was produced and aired by Rede Globo.

Plot 
In 10 episodes, the miniseries tells the love story lived by Saulo (Murilo Benício) and Verônica (Debora Falabella), with the implementation of the first TV network in Brazil as a backdrop. In the series, Saulo is a visionary and passionate man, who dreams of creating the first television network alongside Verônica, who aspires to be a famous actress. Set in the mid-1950s, the series features the drama and conflicts experienced by the couple, as well as the revolution and innovation that marked the early days of television as we know it today.

Cast 
Murilo Benício ...	Saulo Ribeiro
Débora Falabella ... Verônica Maia
Bruna Marquezine ... Beatriz de Souza
Letícia Colin ...	Júlia Azevedo Gomes
Daniel de Oliveira ... Otaviano Azevedo Gomes
Fabrício Boliveira ... Péricles Gonçalves
Bruno Garcia ... Aristides
Alejandro Claveaux ... Rodolfo do Vale
Cássia Kiss ... Odete de Souza
Osmar Prado ... Pompeu Azevedo Gomes
Igor Angelkorte ... Vitor

References

External links
 Official website

2016 Brazilian television series debuts
Rede Globo original programming